Harold Johnston may refer to:

Harold Johnston (footballer) (1895–1978), Australian rules footballer
Harold Whetstone Johnston (1859–1912), American historian known for his writings on ancient Rome
Harold I. Johnston (1892–1949), American soldier and Medal of Honor recipient
Harold S. Johnston (1920–2012), American atmospheric chemist and National Medal of Science laureate

See also
Harry Johnston (disambiguation)
Harold Johnson (disambiguation)
Harold Johnstone, English footballer